Allan Graham White (21 November 1933 – 27 June 2018) was an Australian rules footballer who played for the Carlton Football Club in the Victorian Football League (VFL). He later played for and coached Mildura Imperials in the Sunraysia Football League.

Notes

External links 

Allan White's profile at Blueseum

1933 births
2018 deaths
Carlton Football Club players
Australian rules footballers from Victoria (Australia)